Live Up to Your Name is a 2017 historical time travel South Korean television series. It brings Heo Im (a medical scientist from the Joseon Dynasty portrayed by Kim Nam-gil) to present day Seoul, where he meets the surgeon, Choi Yeon-kyung (Kim Ah-joong). The series marks Kim Nam-gil's small screen comeback after four years. It aired on tvN from August 12 to October 1, 2017.

Its final episode recorded a 6.907% nationwide audience share according to Nielsen paid platform, making the episode one of the highest rated in Korean cable television history.

Synopsis
Heo Im (Kim Nam-gil) is a Joseon doctor of Traditional Korean medicine, specializing in acupuncture. He worked at the clinic for the poor during daytime and earned a fortune by making secret visits to nobles and high-ranking officials' houses at night. After gaining notoriety for his great skills, he was tasked to help treat the king's migraines. Unfortunately, his anxiety got the best of him and he was charged with treason. Unwilling to accept jail, he escaped capture but was chased by soldiers. He was eventually cornered into a river and fatally shot by arrows and fell to his supposed death. Death never came and he awakened in modern Seoul-Korea and realizes he has somehow time traveled. Dazed, lost and confused, he runs into Choi Yeon-kyung (Kim Ah-joong), a cardiothoracic fellow surgeon at Shinhae Hospital and began an unlikely relationship between time and space.

Cast

Main
 Kim Nam-gil as Heo Im / Heo Bong-tak, an acupuncturist who time travels to Seoul 400 years later when he was about to drown.
 Kim Ah-joong as Choi Yeon-kyung, a female surgeon who goes to clubbing after work to relieve stress.

Supporting
 Moon Ga-young as Dong Mak-Gae, Heo Im's loyal assistant who has dreams of becoming a doctor just like her boss.
 Kim Myung-gon as Ma Sung-tae, a renowned but greedy doctor who is  director of a renowned Eastern medicine hospital in Seoul. He is also the grandfather of Yoo Jae-Ha (Yeon-kyung's childhood friend).
 Um Hyo-sup as Heo Jun, a legendary physician from the Joseon Dynasty who was active during the reigns of King Seonjo and King Gwanghae.
 Ahn Suk-hwan as Shin Myung-hoon, the director of the hospital where Yeon-kyung works and consequently her boss/ Minister of War (Joseon), an unnamed corrupt war minister of the Joseon dynasty during the Imjin War.
 Maeng Sang-hoon as Yoo Chan-sung
 Lee Dae-yeon as Professor Hwang, her teacher and superior at the hospital.
 Oh Dae-hwan as Doo-chil, one of the servants of the corrupt Minister of War of Joseon.
 Tae Hang-ho as Min Byung-gi, one of the nurses at Yeon-kyung's grandfather's oriental medicine clinic.
 Kim Byung-choon as Kwon Ji
 Yoo Min-kyu as Yoo Jae-ha, a young doctor of oriental medicine who is Yeon-kyung's childhood friend and Sung-tae's grandson/ Yoo Jin-oh (Joseon), a nobleman from the Joseon Dynasty who has a beef with Heo Im.
 Jin Seon-kyu as Yeon-i's father, the father of Yeon-i (one of Heo Im's patients)
 Yoon Joo-sang as Choi Chun-Sool, a renowned acupuncturist who owns the Haeminseo Oriental Medicine Clinic and is Yeon-kyung's grandfather.
 Byeon Woo-seok as Heo Jun's assistant
 Kim Sung-joo as Kim Min-jae
 Roh Jeong-eui as Oh Ha-ra, a young girl with heart problems whose life is saved by Heo Im.
 Lee Do-yeop as Oh Ha-ra's father
 Lee Ga-ryeong as Gisaeng
 Shin Rin-ah as Yeon-i, a sick girl and one of Heo Im's patients during the Joseon Dynasty.
 Yeom Hye-ran as Restaurant owner (ep. #4)
 Hiromitsu Takeda as Sayaka (Joseon) / Kim Chung-seon (Baptized name after Imjin War), a Japanese general who originally commanded the Japanese Right Army for Kato Kiyomasa before defecting to Korea during the Imjin War.

Ratings

Notes

References

External links
  
 
 
 Live Up to Your Name at Netflix

Japanese invasions of Korea (1592–1598) in fiction
Korean-language television shows
TVN (South Korean TV channel) television dramas
2017 South Korean television series debuts
2017 South Korean television series endings
South Korean fantasy television series
South Korean romantic comedy television series
South Korean medical television series
South Korean time travel television series
Television series by Studio Dragon
Television series by Bon Factory Worldwide